Taddy Arrindell (born 1 January 1951) is an Antiguan cricketer. He played in three first-class and two List A matches for the Leeward Islands in 1976/77.

See also
 List of Leeward Islands first-class cricketers

References

External links
 

1951 births
Living people
Antigua and Barbuda cricketers
Leeward Islands cricketers